Murrayfield Ice Rink is a 3,800-seat multi-purpose arena in the Murrayfield area of Edinburgh, Scotland, adjacent to Murrayfield Stadium. It was built between 1938 and 1939 and is home to the Edinburgh Capitals ice hockey team and a seven-sheet curling rink which was constructed in the 1970s following the closure of Haymarket Ice Rink.

Ice Hockey
The Edinburgh Capitals are the main ice hockey team that are playing out of Murrayfield Ice Rink after it was announced they would be joining the Scottish National League from the 2022–23 season. The rink was formerly home to the Murrayfield Racers from their founding in 2018, until 2022.

Sports and events usage
 Scottish National League (ice hockey)
 NIHL North Cup
 Murrayfield Ice Skaters Club (figure skating)
Murrayfield Juniors Ice Hockey Club
Edinburgh Eagles University Hockey
Recreational Hockey (Caledonia Steel Queens, Edinburgh Knights, Edinburgh Lions, Edinburgh Phoenix, Edinburgh Stingers)
Murrayfield Skating School
Murrayfield Skating Academy
Edinburgh Fringe Festival Venue

References

External links
 Murrayfield Ice Rink Ltd
 Murrayfield Skaters forum

Sports venues in Edinburgh
Indoor arenas in Scotland
Indoor ice hockey venues in Scotland
Sports venues completed in 1952
1952 establishments in Scotland
Curling venues in Scotland